Carabus marietti sapancaensis is a subspecies of black-coloured beetle from the family Carabidae that is endemic to Turkey.

References

marietti sapancaensis
Beetles described in 1967
Endemic fauna of Turkey
Beetles of Asia